PSLV-C5 was the fifth operational launch and overall eighth mission of the Polar Satellite Launch Vehicle program. This launch was also the fifty-second launch by the Indian Space Research Organisation (IRSO) since its first mission on 1 January 1962. The vehicle carried and injected India's remote sensing satellite Resourcesat-1 (also known as IRS-P6) into a sun-synchronous orbit; this was the heaviest and most sophisticated satellite built by IRSO through 2003. PSLV-C5 was launched at 04:52 hours Coordinated Universal Time (10:22 hours Indian Standard Time) on 17 October 2003 from Satish Dhawan Space Centre.

Mission highlights
PSLV-C5 was the fifth operational and overall eighth mission of the PSLV program. The vehicle carried and injected the heaviest and most sophisticated remote sensing satellite built by the ISRO through 2003, Resourcesat-1 (also known as IRS-P6).

Mission parameters
 Mass:
 Total liftoff weight: 
 Payload weight: 
 Overall height: 
 Propellant:
 First stage: Solid HTPB based (138.0 + 6 x 9 tonnes)
 Second stage: Liquid UH 25 +  (41.5 tonnes)
 Third stage: Solid HTPB based (7.6 tonnes)
 Fourth stage: Liquid MMH + MON (2.5 tonnes)
 Engine:
 First stage: Core (PS 1) + 6 strap-on Propellant strap on motors (PSOM)
 Second stage: Vikas
 Third stage: PS 3
 Fourth stage: PS 4
 Thrust:
 First stage: 4,762 + 645 x 6 kN
 Second stage: 800 kN
 Third stage: 246 kN
 Fourth stage: 7.3 x 2 kN
 Altitude: 
 Maximum velocity: (recorded at time of IRS-P6 separation)
 Duration: 1,084 seconds

Payload
PSLV-C5 carried and deployed the ISRO's Resourcesat-1 (a.k.a. IRS-P6) into a sun-synchronous orbit. Resourcesat-1, which carried three cameras ("High Resolution Linear Imaging Self-Scanner", "Medium Resolution Linear Imaging Self-Scanner" and "Advanced Wide Field Sensor") was the tenth ISRO satellite in the IRS series and was intended not only to continue the remote sensing data services provided by IRS-1C and IRS-1D, but also to enhance the data quality. Although IRS-P6 had a design life of five years, the satellite was still operational as of October 2015.

Launch and planned flight profile

PSLV-C5 was launched at 04:52 hours Coordinated Universal Time (10:22 hours Indian Standard Time) on 17 October 2003 from Satish Dhawan Space Centre. The flight profile was as follows:

See also

References 

Spacecraft launched in 2003
Polar Satellite Launch Vehicle